Lincolnton Presbyterian Church and Cemetery is a historic Presbyterian church and its cemetery on N. Washington Street in Lincolnton, Georgia, in Lincoln County, Georgia.  The property was added to the National Register in 1982.

The church building was built in c.1823 and was known as Union Presbyterian Church.  It served Methodist and Baptist congregations in addition to Presbyterians until the other churches could build separately.  The oldest marked grave in the cemetery is from 1834.

References

Presbyterian churches in Georgia (U.S. state)
Protestant Reformed cemeteries
Churches on the National Register of Historic Places in Georgia (U.S. state)
Churches completed in 1823
Buildings and structures in Lincoln County, Georgia
National Register of Historic Places in Lincoln County, Georgia